Leales Department is a department in Tucumán Province, Argentina. It has a population of 51,090 (2001) and an area of 2027 km². The seat of the department is in Bella Vista.

Municipalities and communes
Agua Dulce y La Soledad
Bella Vista
El Mojón
Esquina y Mancopa
Estación Araoz y Tacanas
Ingenio Leales
La Encantada
Las Talas
Los Gómez
Los Puestos
Manuel García Fernández
Quilmes y Los Sueldos
Río Colorado
Santa Rosa de Leales
Villa de Leales 
Villa Fiad

Notes
This article includes content from the Spanish Wikipedia article Departamento Leales.

Departments of Tucumán Province